ACBAR was an experiment to measure the anisotropy of the Cosmic microwave background. It was active 2000-2008.

The ACBAR 145 GHz measurements were the most precise high multipole measurements of the CMB at the time.

See also
Cosmic microwave background experiments
Observational cosmology

Further reading

External links
ACBAR Homepage

Cosmic microwave background experiments
 Astronomical experiments in the Antarctic